{{Infobox television
| image                = 
| image_size           = 
| caption              = 
| num_episodes         = 100
| list_episodes        = #Episodes
| runtime              = 11 minutes
| country              = United KingdomUnited States
| language             = English
| genre                = ComedyMusical
| based_on             = {{Plainlist|
{{Based on|Noddy's Toyland Adventures by Cosgrove Hall Films}}

}}
| creator              = Jymn Magon
| director             = Byron Vaughns
| voices               = Martin SkewsJoanna RuizPavel DouglasRichard NewmanBen SmallTabitha St. GermainCarrie Mullan
| opentheme            = "Make Way for Noddy"by the Kidsongs Kids
| theme_music_composer = Steven BernsteinJulie Bernstein
| composer             = Score:Steven BernsteinJulie BernsteinOriginal Songs:Steven BernsteinJulie BernsteinLorraine FeatherLarry GrossmanMusic Direction:Sharon SampsonTerry Sampson
| producer             = Robert Winthrop  Byron Vaughns
| executive_producer   = Paul Sabella  Jonathan Dern  Carolyn Monroe  Lorrie Lewis  Bradley Hood-Stevenson
| editor               = Jymn Magon
| company              = Chorion  SD Entertainment
| first_aired          = 
| last_aired           = 
| distributor          = Chorion
| network              = Channel 5/Five (United Kingdom)PBS Kids (United States)
| related              = Noddy's Toyland Adventures (1992-1999)Noddy in Toyland (2009)Noddy, Toyland Detective (2016-2017)
}}Make Way for Noddy (stylized make way for NODDY) is a computer-animated musical children's television series that was produced by British animation studio Chorion in conjunction with American animation studio SD Entertainment. Based on Enid Blyton's Noddy character, it was originally broadcast on Channel 5 (later known as Five; in twelve minute segments and as part of the Milkshake! programme) in September 2002.

Premise
The series changed its format in some ways from previous incarnations of Noddy to take advantage of the CGI medium and to appeal to more contemporary audiences, such as Noddy now also being able to fly a plane as part of his taxi duties and making Master Tubby Bear a more believable character. However it largely stuck to what the franchise established prior-hand. In addition to the franchise's characters, Make Way for Noddy also introduced actual children voicing the younger characters of the series.

Characters
Noddy (voiced by Martin Skews in the UK and David A. Kaye/Alberto Ghisi in the US) is the protagonist of the series. Noddy is an imaginative wooden boy who lives in Toyland. Although Noddy is characterised as a child, he also serves as the main taxi driver. He sometimes begins nodding uncontrollably, such as after sneezing, and has to physically stop himself from nodding.
Tessie Bear (voiced by Joanna Ruiz in the UK and Britt McKillip in the US) is a neutral and child-like female teddy bear who is Noddy's best friend, always ready to try something new and help everyone she sees.
Big Ears (voiced by Pavel Douglas in the UK and Michael Dobson in the US) is a gnome who serves as a father figure to Noddy and the other toys with astute knowledge and a fine sense-of-humour.
Dinah Doll (voiced by Andrea Harris in the UK and Tabitha St. Germain in the US) is a Toy Town shopkeeper and a big sibling support figure to Noddy.
Mr. Plod (voiced by Richard Newman in the UK and in the US and Pavel Douglas in the UK and in the US specials and the video games (excluding Noddy and the Magic Moondust) and part of the UK and the US episodes) is Toyland's sole police officer who is persistent for maintaining a certain order but means well and whose catchphrase is "Halt/Stop, in the name of Plod!"
Bumpy Dog (voiced by Ben Small in the UK and Lee Tockar in the US) is Tessie Bear's extremely playful but loyal and sensitive dog.
Gobbo and Sly (voiced by Ben Small in the UK and Don Brown and Doug Parker in the US) are two goblins who serve as the series' antagonists. Gobbo is the more conniving and intelligent one while Sly is the more airheaded and curious of the two members.
Mr. Sparks (voiced by Ben Small in the UK and Lee Tockar in the US) is Toyland's street-smart mechanic.
Miss Pink Cat (voiced by Tabitha St. Germain in the UK and in the US) is the pessimistic and sophisticated owner of Toy Town's ice cream shop. She speaks with a French accent.
Master Tubby Bear (voiced by Carrie Mullan in the UK and Manny Petruzzelli in the US) is a young teddy bear whose role was changed from a tricky mummy's boy (in previous incarnations) to a moody but lovable anti-idol kid in this series, though this was clearly done as it lent more to having him involved in stories, this time in noticeable contrast as a boy hero to Noddy.
Martha Monkey (voiced by Joanna Ruiz in the UK and Kathleen Barr in the US) is a stuffed monkey with an energetic but bossy tomboy personality.
Mr. Jumbo (voiced by Ben Small in the UK and Ian James Corlett in the US) is a mild-mannered stuffed elephant.
Clockwork Mouse (voiced by Joanna Ruiz in the UK and Kathleen Barr in the US) is a perky wind-up toy mouse who isn't sometimes feeling dwarfed by the other inhabitants of Toyland for his size.
Mr. Wobblyman (voiced by Ben Small in the UK and Ian James Corlett in the US) is a roly-poly toy who is always diligent about doing the right thing.
Clockwork Clown (voiced by Ben Small in the UK and Ian James Corlett in the US) is a toy clown.
The Skittles (voiced by Joanna Ruiz, Carrie Johnston and Ben Small in the UK and Teryl Rothery and Chantal Strand in the US) are a family of orderly bowling pins.
Harvey and Cecilia (voiced by Ben Small and Joanna Ruiz in the UK and the US) are two beetles.

Production

 Development 
The series was first announced to be in production in October 2000, with 100 11-minute episodes and a feature-length Christmas special announced to be in production for a 2001 delivery. In January 2001, SD Entertainment were announced to be co-producers on the series and they announced it would be their first project.

 Soundtrack 
The soundtrack was composed by Steven and Julie Bernstein with additional songs by Larry Grossman and Lorraine Feather, with Terry and Sharon Sampson directing the music and the cast of the TV show Kidsongs performing the theme song and the music video segments for the series.

 Distribution 
Channel 5 acquired the UK broadcast rights to the series in the summer of 2002 for a broadcast within the fall schedule. In June 2002, Universal Pictures Video acquired UK video rights to the series from Chorion.

 Say It with Noddy 
A spin-off interstitial series, Say it with Noddy, aired as part of the main show in the US and as a separate program in the UK. It featured Noddy learning various foreign language words (Spanish, French, Swahili, Russian and Mandarin) from a robot named Whizz (voiced by Matt Hill in the US and Justin Fletcher in the UK).

American version
In 2001, the series premiered in the United States on PBS Kids. As PBS lacks commercials, the series was edited to fit a half-hour, gaining a longer format featuring two twelve minute segments, two interstitial programs, a music video and footage of British television presenter Naomi Wilkinson from Milkshake!.''

PBS acquired US broadcast rights in October 2004. In the US, the series aired from 11 September 2005 to 15 June 2007 and later reran until September 2015 on NBC and PBS Kids Sprout in the US.  the series is available to stream on Peacock.

Episodes

Season 1 (US, 2001)

Season 2 (2001, US)

Specials (2004–2006)

Notes

References 

2002 American television series debuts
2003 American television series endings
2000s American animated television series
2002 British television series debuts
2003 British television series endings
2000s British animated television series
American children's animated comedy television series
American children's animated fantasy television series
American children's animated musical television series
American computer-animated television series
American preschool education television series
American television shows based on children's books
American television series with live action and animation
British children's animated comedy television series
British children's animated fantasy television series
British children's animated musical television series
British computer-animated television series
British preschool education television series
British television shows based on children's books
British television series with live action and animation
Animated preschool education television series
2000s preschool education television series
Channel 5 (British TV channel) original programming
DreamWorks Classics
English-language television shows
Adaptations of works by Enid Blyton
PBS Kids shows
PBS original programming
S4C original programming
Television series by Universal Television
Television series created by Jymn Magon